360 may refer to:

 360 (number)
 360 AD, a year
 360 BC, a year
 360 degrees, a circle

Businesses and organizations
 360 Architecture, an American architectural design firm
 Ngong Ping 360, a tourism project in Lantau Island, Hong Kong
 Qihoo 360, a Chinese software company
 ThreeSixty, a Hong Kong supermarket

Electronics and software

Computing
 System/360, a computing product line by IBM
 System/360 architecture, a computing architecture by IBM

Electronics
 Moto 360, a smartwatch by Motorola
 Rickenbacker 360, an electric, semi-acoustic guitar by string instrument manufacturer Rickenbacker
 Xbox 360, a video game console by Microsoft

Software
 Qihoo 360, a Chinese software company
 360 Safeguard, a brand of security software developed by Qihoo 360
 360 Secure Browser, a web browser developed by Qihoo 360
 Norton 360, a computer security suite by Symantec

Media

Music
 360 (rapper), an Australian hip hop artist
 360° (Chelo album)
 360° (Dreadzone album)
 360° (Tinchy Stryder album)
 U2 360° Tour, a music performance tour by the band U2
 360, the 4th album by The Supernaturals

Television
 Anderson Cooper 360°, a CNN television news program
 Battle 360°, a 2008 American documentary television series
 360 (Turkey), a Turkish TV channel

Other media
 360 (film), a 2011 film
 360 (magazine), a magazine by Imagine Publishing covering the Xbox 360
 360: Three Sixty, a racing video game released on Sony PlayStation
 News360, a news aggregator app
 Yahoo! 360°, Yahoo's blogging platform

Vehicles

Aircraft
 Short 360, a British commuter aircraft

Automobiles
 Baojun 360, a Chinese compact MPV
 Ferrari 360, an Italian sports car
 Mitsubishi 360, a Japanese light commercial vehicle series
 Roewe 360, a Chinese compact sedan
 Subaru 360, a Japanese kei car
 Volvo 360, a Swedish compact car

Other uses
 360 deal or 360° deal, a business relationship between artist and company
 360-degree feedback, a process in company performance reviews of soliciting opinions from a wider range of sources
 Area code 360, the telephone area code for western Washington state, United States
 Circle-Vision 360°, multi-camera filmmaking technology from Walt Disney Imagineering
 Rubik's 360, a three-dimensional mechanical puzzle
 Three60, Manchester, a residential skyscraper under construction in Manchester, England
 Nai Wai stop, station code
 Panoramic photography, or 360° photography.